Konstantin Fedorovich Katushev (October 1, 1927, Bolshoye Boldino, Bolsheboldinsky District of the Nizhny Novgorod Oblast – April 5, 2010, Moscow) was a Soviet party official and statesman, Secretary of the Central Committee of the Communist Party of the Soviet Union (1968–77), Deputy Chairman of the Council of Ministers of the Soviet Union (1977–82), Chairman of the State Committee of the Soviet Union for Foreign Economic Relations (1985–88), Minister of Foreign Economic Relations of the Soviet Union (1988–91).

Member of the Communist Party of the Soviet Union since 1952. Member of the Central Committee of the Communist Party of the Soviet Union (1966–1990). Deputy of the Supreme Soviet of the Soviet Union (1966–84 and 1986–89).

Biography
Born into a teaching family. After school, he graduated from Gorky Polytechnic Institute, where he studied in 1945–1951 years, a mechanical engineer. He was sent to work at the Gorky Automobile Plant. After graduating from the institute, he works at a car factory in the design experimental department as a mechanic engineer for tracked vehicles and achieves such success that he was appointed deputy chief designer. An important achievement of the young engineer was the creation of the GAZ–47 amphibious armored personnel carrier. Since 1957 in party work: Secretary of the Party Bureau of the design and experimental department of the plant, since 1959, Second Secretary of the Avtozavodsky Regional Party Committee in Gorky, since 1961, Secretary of the Party Committee of the Gorky Automobile Plant.

In 1963–1965, the First Secretary of the Gorky City Committee of the Communist Party of the Soviet Union, then in 1965–1968 – the Gorky Regional Committee of the Communist Party of the Soviet Union.

From April 1968 to May 1977, Secretary of the Central Committee of the Communist Party of the Soviet Union (for relations with socialist countries, member countries of the Council for Mutual Economic Assistance, member countries of the Warsaw Pact), at the same time since 1972, head of the Department of the Central Committee of the Communist Party of the Soviet Union for communications with the communist and workers' parties of the socialist countries.

In 1977, he was approved as Deputy Chairman of the Council of Ministers of the Soviet Union (it is noted that "this was a demotion compared to the post of Secretary of the Central Committee of the Communist Party of the Soviet Union") – in 1977–1980 Permanent Representative of the Soviet Union in the Council for Mutual Economic Assistance, then Deputy Chairman of the Council Ministers of the Soviet Union – curator of the ministries of railways, the Navy, transport construction, communications.

In 1982–1985, he was the ambassador of the Soviet Union to Cuba.

In 1985, he was appointed Chairman of the State Committee of the Soviet Union for Foreign Economic Relations.

In 1988–1991 – Minister of Foreign Economic Relations of the Soviet Union. Then a personal pensioner of federal significance.

In the post–Soviet period of Russian history, he held executive positions in a number of commercial banks ("Diamant", "VIP–Bank").

He was buried on April 5, 2010, at the Troekurovsky Cemetery in Moscow.

Academician of the International Academy of Spiritual Unity of the Nations of the World, Academician and Professor of the Academy of Security, Defense and Law Enforcement Problems.

Awards
3 Orders of Lenin;
Order of the October Revolution (September 30, 1987);
Medals;
Order of the Renaissance of the Republic of Cuba;
Orders and medals of the Mongolian People's Republic, Vietnam, Afghanistan.

References

External links

The Fate and Career of Konstantin Katushev
People and Books

1927 births
2010 deaths
Burials in Troyekurovskoye Cemetery
Recipients of the Order of Lenin
Secretariat of the Central Committee of the Communist Party of the Soviet Union members
Ambassadors of the Soviet Union to Cuba
Tenth convocation members of the Supreme Soviet of the Soviet Union
Ninth convocation members of the Supreme Soviet of the Soviet Union
Eighth convocation members of the Supreme Soviet of the Soviet Union
Seventh convocation members of the Supreme Soviet of the Soviet Union
Soviet mechanical engineers
First Secretaries of the Gorky Regional Committee of the CPSU